Journal of Global Infectious Diseases is a peer-reviewed open access journal published on behalf of the Global Infectiologists Network. The journal publishes articles on the subject of Infectious Diseases, Microbiology including bacteriology, virology, mycology and parasitology, Immunology, Public Health, Critical Care, Epidemiology, Nutrition, Pharmacotherapeutics.

The journal is indexed with Caspur, DOAJ, EBSCO Publishing’s Electronic Databases, Expanded Academic ASAP, Genamics JournalSeek, Google Scholar, Health & Wellness Research Center, Health Reference Center Academic, Hinari, Index Copernicus, OpenJGate, PubMed, Pubmed Central, SCOLOAR, SIIC databases, Ulrich’s International Periodical Directory.

There are no page charges for submissions to the journal, but you have to pay 500$ prior to publication.

External links 
 Journal homepage

Open access journals
English-language journals
Quarterly journals
Medknow Publications academic journals
Microbiology journals